Nigar Valiyeva  is an Azerbaijani linguist and professor of English Lexicology and Stylistics at the Azerbaijan University of Languages. She is a member of the Union of Azerbaijani Writers and a member of the International Fund for Cooperation and Partnership of the Black Sea and the Caspian Sea.

Biography

Early life  
Nigar Valiyeva was born on February 14, 1971, in Baku, Azerbaijan into an intellectual family. Her father, Chingiz Bulbuloglu Mammadov (born 1938), is an Azerbaijani State Adviser of the second class of public service, second son of the famous Azerbaijani and Soviet opera tenor, folk music performer, founder of vocal arts and national musical theatre in Azerbaijan Bulbul and Adelaida Mammadova, Bulbul’s museum director, public figure and biologist of Institute of Botany of NANA Elmira Mikayil qizi Zeynalova (1945).

Her uncle (mother’s older brother) Ibrahim Zeynalov (1934–2008) was a Soviet and Azerbaijani sculptor, teacher, professor, Honored Artist of Azerbaijan, State Prize Laureate of USSR and Azerbaijan SSR, director of Museum of Art.

Her uncle (father’s younger brother) Polad Bülbüloğlu (1945) is a Soviet and Azerbaijani singer, composer, professor, politician, and diplomat.

Education 
She went to High School № 189 in Baku between 1977 and 1987. In 1987 Nigar Valiyeva entered "the English and German languages" department of the Azerbaijan State Pedagogical Institute of Foreign Languages and graduated with an honors diploma in 1992. From 1992–1995 she was a post-graduate student of "the General Linguistics" department of the Azerbaijan State Pedagogical Institute of Foreign Languages.

Scientific activities 
On April 11, 1996, she was admitted as a young specialist to the English Grammar department of the Azerbaijan State Institute of Languages. In 1996 she defended her dissertation on the theme "The phraseological units, formed by means of the verbs of speaking and thinking" (on the materials of the Azerbaijani, English and Russian languages) and was conferred the scientific degree Candidate of Philology (Ph.D. degree in Linguistics). In 2000 she was elected as the chief teacher of the English Grammar department of the Azerbaijan University of Languages. 

 In 2001 she was elected as the assistant professor of the English Grammar department of the Azerbaijan University of Languages and she has got the academic rank of the assistant professor.
 In 2004 she defended her thesis for a doctor’s degree on the theme "The comparative and linguistic analysis of the phraseological word combinations" (on the materials of the English, Azerbaijani and Russian languages) in specialized fields "Theory of the Language" – February 10, 2019, and "German Languages" – February 10, 2004, and was conferred the scientific degree Doctor of Philology.
 In 2007 she got the title of Professor, Doctor of Philology of the English Grammar department of the Azerbaijan University of Languages and she has got the academic rank of the professor.
 In 2001 she is a member of YAP (New Azerbaijan Party) (membership card № 174728).
 Since 2005 she is the responsible editor of the Department of Western Philology of the International Scientific Theoretical Journal "Language and Literature" of Baku State University.
 In 2006–2009 she was a member of the Scientific Workshop of AUL.
 Since 2007 she has served as Deputy Editor of the International Scientific-Theoretical Journal Language and Literature of Baku State University.
 In 2009–2019 she was a member of the Defense Council of AUL.
 Since 2011 she is a member of the European Linguistic Society.
 Since 2013 she is a member of the International Fund for Cooperation and Partnership of the Black Sea and the Caspian Sea – (BSCSIF).
 In 2013 she was appointed as the Chief of English History and Lexicology’s Department of the Azerbaijan University of Languages.
 In 2017 she was appointed as the Chief of English Department of Azerbaijan State Marine Academy.
 Since 2018 she is the Member of Writers Union of Azerbaijan.
 Since 2018 she is Professor of English Lexicology and Stylistics № 1 Department of AUL.
 Since 2019 she is a member of the expert commission of the Higher Attestation Commission for Philology.
 Since 2019 she is the Chairman of the Teaching and Methodological Council of the Faculty of Education of AUL.

Sphere of the Investigation (Research Field): The investigations in General Linguistics, the Theory of Language, Theoretical Grammar, Communicative Grammar, German languages, Comparative Typology, the Theory of Text, the Theory of the Translation, Lexicography, and Phraseology, Linguaculturology, Pedagogics, Psychology, Lexicology, Sociolinguistics, Stylistics, Pragmatics, Logic, Linguadidactics, and Literature of the Region, Psycholinguistics, Multiculturalism.

Works

Published works 
It is more than 25 years that professor Nigar Valiyeva has been teaching English and studying the grammatical structure and the lexical system of English, Azerbaijani and Russian contrastively. During these years she has got published five books for higher schools and more than 200 articles in the international scientific journals and 20 monographs. She participates in international seminars, symposiums, and conferences more than 30 times.

Scientific works 
Monographs, textbooks, text editions, dictionaries, programs
 1999 – The phraseological units which are formed by means of the verbs of speaking and thinking in non-cognate languages. Baku, "Publishing House of the Azerbaijan University of Languages", 103 p.
 2001 – The structural-semantic peculiarities of the free word-groups in modern English. Baku, The Republic of Azerbaijan "ХКB and Polygraphy", 61 p.
 2001 – The Comparative Linguistic Analysis of the Phraseological Word Combinations (on the basis of the material of Azerbaijani, English, and Russian). Baku, "XKB and Polygraphy", 220 p.
 2006 – Azerbaijani-English-Russian Idiomatic Dictionary. Baku, "Nurlan" Publishing House, 460 p.
 2008 – The Typological Analysis of the Verbal Word-groups in Non-kindred Languages. Azerbaijan Republic, Baku, "Europe" Publishing House, 862 p.
 2010 – Large Triglot Phraseological Dictionary. Republic of Azerbaijan, Baku, "Azernashr", 2 Volumes, 1 volume, 988 p., 2 volume, 987 p., 1975 p.
 2011 – Actual Problems of Language Typology. Baku, "Science and Education", 512 p.
 2013 – Some Aspects and Peculiarities of Intercultural Communication in the Process of Globalization, Belgrade, International Business Serviced.o.o., Cooper Green Advertising d.o.o., Publishing House: Jovsic Printing Centar d.o.o., 242 p.
 2013 – Translation of the book "The Armenian Tragedy in 1915" from Russian into English, Baku, The Ministry of Culture and Tourism of the Azerbaijan Republic, "Azernashr", 136 p.
 2013 – Program for Masters. An Introductory Course in the History of the English  Language. Vəsait "E.L." Nəşriyyat və Poliqrafiya Şirkəti MMC-nin mətbəəsi, 28 p.
 2013 – Some Aspects and Peculiarities of Intercultural Communication in the Process of Globalization, Baku, "Science and Education", 501 p.
 2014 – Theoretical Issues of Stylistic Lexicology, Baku, "Azerbaijan State Publishing", LLC, 185 p.
 2014 – Communicative-Pragmatic Paradigm of English Lexicology. Baku, "Science and Education", 288 p.
 2016 – Language of Education and Education of Language during Intercultural dialogue or Global Communication Process, Baku, "Science and Education",264p.
 2016 – Synergetics of the Language, National Consciousness and Culture by Globalization, Baku, "Nurlar" Publishing-Printing Center, 232 p.
 2017 – Azerbaijani-English Idiomatic Dictionary, Baku, "Mutarjim", 764 p.
 2017 – Translation of the book "Rights and Freedoms of Man and Citizen" from Azerbaijani into Russian, Baku, "Europe", 175 p.
 2017 – Language Development During Multiculturalism in the Globalized World, Baku, "Europe" Publishing House, 482 p.
 2018 – Explanatory Azerbaijani – English – Russian Dictionary of the Communication’s Terms, Baku, "Vatanoglu" Publishing House, 352 p.
 2018 – Synergetics of the Language, National Consciousness and Culture by Globalization. Germany, Saarbrükken, Lambert Academic Publishing House, 232 p.
 2018 – Introductory Course to the English Stylistics, Baku, "Vatanoglu" Publishing House, 450 p.
 2018 – Language of Education and Education of Language during Intercultural dialogue or Global Communication Process. Germany, Saarbrücken, Lambert Academic Publishing House, 264 p.
 2019 – Comparative Typology of the Modern English, Russian and Azerbaijani, Serbia, Belgrade, Total Trade International d.o.o., SZGR Jovan Antic, 470 p.
 2019 – A Paradigm of Contrastive Lexicology of the English and Azerbaijani Languages, Baku, "Science and Education", 416 p.
 2019 – Program for Masters. Contrastive Lexicology of the English and Azerbaijani Languages, Baku, "Science and Education" Publishing House, 32 p.
 2019 – Translation of the book "Eternal as Azerbaijan. Heydar Aliyev in my Life" from Azerbaijani into English, II Volume, Baku, "Azernashr" Publishing House, 203 p.
 2019 – An Introduction to the History of Global English, Baku, "Science and Education", 676 p.

Awards 
 In 2012 she was awarded by the Gold Medal of "The Best Patriotic Researcher Scientist" by the European Publishing House of the Azerbaijan Republic.
 In 2016 she was awarded "Best Teacher of the Year" by the leadership of the Ministry of Education of the Azerbaijan Republic and the Azerbaijan University of Languages.

References

Azerbaijani professors
Azerbaijani women academics
Living people
1971 births